, also known as Anri (あんり), is a Japanese stage, film, TV, and voice actor, affiliated with Ruby Parade. He is also a member of the performance unit Tokyo Ryūsei-gun since 2012

Biography
Yūya Asato was born on December 4, 1987, in Okinawa Prefecture, Japan. After graduating high school, he was enrolled into a preparatory school but decided to quit midway through his summer course to move to Tokyo. In January 2011, he joined Ruby Parade after being introduced to an event company president through an acquaintance. Since then, he has appeared in various 2.5D musical and stage play adaptations such as Kagami Taiga in Kuroko's Basketball and F6 Ichimatsu from Osomatsu-san on Stage: Six Men's Show Time. In 2017, he landed his first anime voice acting role as Kai von Granzreich in The Royal Tutor, which he also portrayed in the tie-in stage adaptations and theatrical movie.

Filmography

Theater

Films

TV series

Anime

Game

Discography

CD

References

External links 
 Official site 
  Yūya Asato Twitter 
 Official Fanclub 
 Official Blog 

1987 births
Living people
21st-century Japanese male actors
Japanese male stage actors
Japanese television personalities
Japanese male voice actors
Male voice actors from Okinawa Prefecture